Louisa Collins (formerly Andrews nee Hall;) 11 August 1847 – 8 January 1889) was an Australian poisoner and convicted murderer. Collins, who was dubbed the "Borgia of Botany" by the press of the day, endured four trials in front of 48 men, after the first three juries failed to convict. Collins was hanged at Darlinghurst Gaol on the morning of 8 January 1889.

Early life
Born Louisa Hall at Belltrees near Scone, New South Wales on 11 August 1847, one of at least seven children of Henry Hall and his wife Catherine (née Ring). Henry Hall was a native of Birmingham, England, who had been sent to Australia as a convict in 1831 on board the ship Asia;   Catherine was a migrant from Ireland.

At a young age, Louisa married Charles Andrews, a butcher. Louisa and Andrews had nine children, only seven of whom survived infancy. By December 1886, Andrews had moved his family to the inner-city suburb of Botany. Andrews had work as a wool washer that used chemicals, including arsenic, to wash the wool before export. To make ends meet, the family took in lodgers. One of Andrew's co-workers was Michael Collins, who took up residence in the Andrews' family home.

Charles Andrews discovered the liaison between his wife and Michael Collins in December 1886. Charles Andrews confronted Michael Collins and threw him out of the boarding house.

Widowed
On 31 January 1887 Charles Andrews signed a will that was drawn up by a clerk at the insurance office. Soon after, he started to feel violently ill, suffering from stomach cramps, vomiting and diarrhoea. Andrews died on 2 February 1887. The now-widowed Mrs. Louisa Andrews quickly applied for the life insurance of her dead husband.

Acquaintances were not surprised that she took up with Michael Collins soon after the death of her first husband. Louisa Collins stated they were married on 9 April 1887, within two months of Charles Andrews' funeral. she was four months pregnant on her wedding day. Her child, John Collins, born in 1887, died and was buried in a pauper's grave.

Michael Collins fell ill after he and Louisa had been married for one year. Immediately before his death on 8 July 1888, he displayed the same symptoms as Charles Andrews had in 1887.

Inquest
A coroners inquest was held at the South Sydney Morgue by Mr. H. Shiell, J.P (the City Coroner) Michael Collins' life was not insured.

Neighbours were suspicious that both husbands of Louisa Collins had died with the same symptoms. Andrews' body was exhumed and a chemical analysis found the presence of arsenic. The autopsy of Michael Collins declared the cause of death to be arsenical poisoning. Louisa Collins was arrested for the murder of both men on the recommendation of the coroner, as she was the only person who nursed the men during their illnesses.

Trials
One of Louisa Collins' sons from her first marriage, Arthur Andrews, gave evidence that his father was a healthy man who could work a 15-hour day if necessary. Some of the most important testimony was given by Collins' only daughter, May Andrews;just 10 years old at the time of the first trial, she gave evidence that the family kept Rough on Rats – a deadly arsenic-based poison. Sydney was suffering a rat plague in the 1880s, which led to boom sales for the product, which was the basis of the case against Collins.

Collins endured four trials, the first three failed to find a verdict. She did not call any witnesses to her defence.

Execution
On 8 January 1889, Louisa Collins was hanged at Darlinghurst gaol. She was the first woman to be executed in Darlinghurst Gaol.She was the last woman to hang in the state of New South Wales.

Publication
The first full-length examination of the case, Last Woman Hanged: the Terrible True Story of Louisa Collins, by Australian author and journalist Caroline Overington, was published in 2014.

A novel, The Killing of Louisa by Janet Lee, was published by UQP in 2018.

Victims
Charles Andrews 52
Michael Peter Collins 26

References

Bibliography
Holledge, James Australia's Wicked Women
Main, Jim  Hanged , Executions in Australia 
Overington, Caroline  Last Woman Hanged 
Baxter, Carole, Black Widow 

People executed by Australia by hanging
1849 births
1889 deaths
People executed by New South Wales
Australian people convicted of murder
People convicted of murder by New South Wales
19th-century executions by Australia
Australian female murderers
Executed Australian women
People executed for murder
People executed by Australian colonies by hanging
Mariticides
19th-century Australian criminals
1887 murders in Australia
1888 murders in Australia